Minuscule 559 (in the Gregory-Aland numbering), ε 139 (in the Soden numbering), is a Greek minuscule manuscript of the New Testament, on a parchment. Palaeographically it has been assigned to the 11th century. The manuscript is lacunose. 
Scrivener labeled it by number 518.

Description 

The codex contains the text of the four Gospels on 152 parchment leaves (size ) with some lacunae (Mark 1:1-14; 4:20-30; Luke 1:1-13; John 1:1-17; 4:9-30; 9:14-20:25). The first pages of Mark, Luke, and John have been taken away for the sake of illuminations. The manuscript is damaged by humidity, and much of the text is illegible.

The writing is in one column per page, 24 lines per page. The initial letters are in gold.
The Ammonian Sections (in Mark 2:34 - 16:9), in red, were added by a later hand. There is no the Eusebian Canons.

Text 

The Greek text of the codex is a representative of the Byzantine text-type. Hermann von Soden classified it to the textual family Kx. Aland placed it in Category V.
According to Wisse's Profile Method it represents the textual family Kx in Luke 1 and Luke 10. In Luke 20 it has mixed Byzantine text. It has an unusual readings.

History 

The manuscript was in the possession of Edward Payne, who presented it to Sion College in London (along with lectionaries ℓ 234 and ℓ 235).

The manuscript was added to the list of the New Testament minuscule manuscripts by F. H. A. Scrivener (518) and C. R. Gregory (559).

Formerly held in Sion College Library (Arc L 40.2/G 3), the manuscript is now in Lambeth Palace Library, London.

See also 

 List of New Testament minuscules
 Biblical manuscript
 Textual criticism

References

Further reading 

 C. Steenbuch, Minuscule MS Evan. 559 (XI Cent.), JTS XVI (1915), pp. 264–267.

Greek New Testament minuscules
11th-century biblical manuscripts